Nikolai Dubinin may refer to:

Nicolai Dubinin (born 1973), Russian Roman Catholic prelate
Nikolay Dubinin (1907–1988),  Russian biologist and academician